This is a list of species in the agaric genus Coprinus.

Species 
, Species Fungorum accepted 141 species of Coprinus.

 Coprinus acidorus
 Coprinus agricola
 Coprinus alachuanus
 Coprinus albidofloccosus
 Coprinus alnicola
 Coprinus amphibius
 Coprinus apiculatus
 Coprinus arachnoideus
 Coprinus arenacolens
 Coprinus arenatus
 Coprinus asterophoroides
 Coprinus asterophorus
 Coprinus astroideus
 Coprinus ater
 Coprinus aurantiacus
 Coprinus aureovillosus
 Coprinus australiensis
 Coprinus bakeri
 Coprinus bambusicola
 Coprinus baumannii
 Coprinus boninensis
 Coprinus bryantii
 Coprinus callistoflavus
 Coprinus calvescens
 Coprinus calyptratus
 Coprinus capillaripes
 Coprinus chacaritae
 Coprinus cheesmanii
 Coprinus cineratus
 Coprinus citrinovelatus
 Coprinus coffeicola
 Coprinus colensoi
 Coprinus colosseus
 Coprinus columellifer
 Coprinus comatoides
 Coprinus comatus
 Coprinus concolor
 Coprinus confertus
 Coprinus cono-truncatus
 Coprinus coopertus
 Coprinus deserticola
 Coprinus disseminatoides
 Coprinus ebulbosus
 Coprinus echinatulus
 Coprinus echinatus
 Coprinus edulis
 Coprinus elongatipes
 Coprinus flavogriseus
 Coprinus flos-lactis
 Coprinus fuscosporus
 Coprinus gibbsii
 Coprinus giganteoporus
 Coprinus giganteosporus
 Coprinus giganteus
 Coprinus gigasporus
 Coprinus glandulifer
 Coprinus globisporus
 Coprinus grambergii
 Coprinus grandisporus
 Coprinus griseofoetidus
 Coprinus heimii
 Coprinus humilis
 Coprinus idiolepis
 Coprinus ixosporus
 Coprinus jalapensis
 Coprinus laceratus
 Coprinus laciniatus
 Coprinus laniger
 Coprinus leucostictus
 Coprinus leviceps
 Coprinus levipes
 Coprinus levisticolens
 Coprinus littoralis
 Coprinus longipes
 Coprinus macrosporus
 Coprinus marginatus
 Coprinus melo
 Coprinus micaceoides
 Coprinus miniatoflexuosus
 Coprinus molestus
 Coprinus neoradicans
 Coprinus nigrostriatus
 Coprinus ornatus
 Coprinus palmeranus
 Coprinus pampeanus
 Coprinus paramicaceus
 Coprinus parvisporus
 Coprinus perpusillus
 Coprinus petasiformis
 Coprinus phalloideus
 Coprinus phylladophilus
 Coprinus picosporus
 Coprinus pinetorum
 Coprinus platensis
 Coprinus platysporus
 Coprinus plumbeus
 Coprinus praemagnus
 Coprinus preussii
 Coprinus pseudocomatus
 Coprinus pseudodomesticus
 Coprinus pseudoplicatus
 Coprinus pusio
 Coprinus quadrifidus
 Coprinus retisporus
 Coprinus revolutus
 Coprinus rimosus
 Coprinus romagnesii
 Coprinus roseistipitatus
 Coprinus rostrupianus
 Coprinus rotundisporus
 Coprinus rufolanatus
 Coprinus saatiensis
 Coprinus sclerotianus
 Coprinus semianus
 Coprinus semilanatus
 Coprinus seymourii
 Coprinus sigillatus
 Coprinus spadiceisporus
 Coprinus speciosulus
 Coprinus sphaerophorus
 Coprinus spragueiformis
 Coprinus stanfordianus
 Coprinus staudtii
 Coprinus steppicola
 Coprinus sterquilinus
 Coprinus stiriacus
 Coprinus straminis
 Coprinus subacaulis
 Coprinus subplicatilis
 Coprinus subradiatus
 Coprinus subroris
 Coprinus suburticicola
 Coprinus trigonosporus
 Coprinus umbrinus
 Coprinus uspallatae
 Coprinus velox
 Coprinus virgineus
 Coprinus volutus
 Coprinus vosoustii
 Coprinus westii
 Coprinus xerophilus

References 

Coprinus species, List of